Werner's lipinia (Lipinia miangensis) is a species of skink found in Indonesia.

References

Lipinia
Reptiles described in 1910
Taxa named by Franz Werner